or  is a term informally used in Japan to refer to those firms which, collectively, are perceived to be the largest firms headquartered in Japan and distinguished in comparison to their other competitors. The Big Four firms are:

Anderson Mōri & Tomotsune
Mori Hamada & Matsumoto
Nagashima Ohno & Tsunematsu
Nishimura & Asahi

Nowadays, the term "Big Five" is also being used to include the fifth-largest firm in Japan, TMI Associates.

These are leading law firms in Japanese business law practices and considered to be the top tier.

"International firm"
In Japanese, the term  is used to refer to the Big Four firms and other Japanese law firms that specialize in international business matters. During the years immediately following World War II, several American lawyers established such firms in Japan (e.g. Anderson Mori). Japanese lawyers with international training began establishing international firms in the 1960s, and since regulatory changes in the 1990s, many Japanese lawyers have joined or partnered with Tokyo offices of major multinational law firms.

Other Japanese firms historically grouped in the "international firm" category include:

 Mitsui, Yasuda, Wani & Maeda (dissolved in 2004, with a number of lawyers joining the Tokyo office of Linklaters)
 Tokyo Aoyama Law Offices and Aoki Law Offices (merged in 2001 to form the Japanese arm of Baker & McKenzie)

See also

White shoe firm
Magic circle law firms
Red circle law firms

References

Law firms of Japan